Asian Highway 61 or AH61 is an international route running  from Kashi in China to Krupets in Russia. This route passes through Kyrgyzstan and Kazakhstan also.

Route
Kashi – Turugart – Torougart – Naryn – Bishkek – Georgievka – Kordai – Merke – Shymkent – Kyzylorda – Aralsk – Karabutak – Aktyubinsk – Ural’sk – Kamenka – Ozinki – Saratov – Borysoglebsk – Voronezh – Kursk – Krupets – Border of Ukraine.

Associated routes

China
 : Kashgar - Kuquwan
 : Kuquwan - junction with G3013
 : junction with G3013 - Tuopa
 : Tuopa - Torugart Pass police station
 : Torugart Pass police station - Torugart Pass border checkpoint

Kyrgyzstan
  ЭМ-11 Road: Torugart Pass - Bishkek
  ЭМ-01 Road: Bishkek - Georgievka

Kazakhstan
 Branch :  Korday - Merki
 : Merki - Shymkent
 : Shymkent - Oral
 : Oral - Border of Russia

Russia 
: border with Kazakhstan - Ozinki – Yershov – Pristannoye – Saratov
: Saratov - Borisoglebsk
: Borisoglebsk – Voronezh - Kursk
: within Kursk
38K-010: Kursk – Kurchatov
38K-017: Kurchatov – Lgov – Rylsk – border with Ukraine

Junctions

China
 Kashgar (Kashi)
 Kashgar

Kyrgyzstan 
  Bishkek

Kazakhstan
 Merke
 Shymkent
 Uralsk

Russia
  Borisoglebsk

Gallery

See also
 Asian Highway 60
 List of Asian Highways

References

External links
 Asian countries Treaty on Asian Highways with routes
Asian Highway AH61 on OpenStreetMap

Asian Highway Network
Roads in Russia
Roads in Kazakhstan
Roads in Kyrgyzstan
Roads in China